Kurmai or Kurmoi or Koormayi is a village in Palamaner mandal of Chittoor district of Andhra Pradesh, India.

Geography
There is an ancient Kurma Varadarajaswamy Temple located in this place.

References

Villages in Chittoor district